Bavel District is a district (srok)  of Battambang Province, in north-western Cambodia.

Administration 
The district is subdivided into 6 communes (khum).

Communes and villages

References 

 
Districts of Battambang province